Everybody Makes Mistakes is the fifth album by Starflyer 59, released in November 16, 1999. For this album, the band continued to develop its sound in the same direction that they had taken for their previous release, The Fashion Focus. The song "Play the C Chord" would become the most common song to appear on their live releases.

Track listing
All songs written by Jason Martin.

Credits
Starflyer 59
Jason Martin – vocals, guitar
Jeff Cloud – bass guitar
Wayne Everett – drums
Gene Eugene – keyboards, production

Additional personnel
Brandon Ebel – executive producer
Jason Gnewikow – art direction and design

References

Starflyer 59 albums
1999 albums
Tooth & Nail Records albums